Peperomia venusta is a species of subshrub from the genus Peperomia. It grows in wet tropical biomes. It was first described by Truman G. Yuncker in 1957.

Distribution
Peperomia venusta is native to Venezuela and Colombia. Specimens can be collected at an elevation of 240-1000 meters.

Description
It is a glabrous herb. The stem lies on the ground and the roots are at the lower nodes. The branches ascend to 10 centimeters or more, it is 1-3 millimeters thick at the base when dry, the internodes are 2 centimeters long above, and lengthen to 10 centimeters or more when downward. Leaves alternate, Broad-lance, gradually narrowed to the blunt tip, peltate are 5-10 millimeters above the rounded base, the lower leaves are 3-4 centimeters wide and 7-8 centimeters long. It is palmately 7-9 nerved, the nerves are conspicuous beneath and obscurely branched upward. The innermost two pairs of lateral nerves gently curve and continue to the tip. It is translucent, glandular-dotted beneath, and lacks ciliolation. The petioles are up to 8 centimeters long on lower leaves and scarcely 1 centimeter long on the smaller upper leaves. Terminal spikes and axillary are 2 millimeters thick and 2-4 centimeters long, and the peduncle to 3 centimeters long.

References

venusta
Flora of Venezuela
Flora of Colombia
Plants described in 1957
Taxa named by Truman G. Yuncker